Randi Bjørgen (born 27 June 1947) is a Norwegian trade unionist.

A biological engineer by profession, she led the Kommunale Funksjonærers Landsforbund from 1987 to 1996, and from 1996 to 2006 she led the Confederation of Vocational Unions.

References

1947 births
Living people
Norwegian trade unionists